Sultan ‛Ali Mashhadi,  (full name: Sultan Ali-i Muhammad-i Mashhadi) (fl 1453–1519, d. 1520) was a Persian calligrapher and master of nastaliq script.

Born in Mashhad, Sultan ‛Ali lost his father when he was seven and that early on in life he began practicing calligraphy on his own. He was autodidact till he moved to Herat somewhere around the year 1468. There he was trained by Azhar, or by one of Azhar’s students. From 1470 Sultan ‛Ali worked for the major bibliophiles of the time, Sultan Husayn (1469-1506) and his boon companion ‛Alishir Nava’i. He designed architectural inscriptions, such as the one (1477–8) on the marble platform for the tombstones of Sultan Husayn’s ancestors erected in the Shrine of Khwaja Abd Allah. He also calligraphed some of the finest Persian and Turkish manuscripts produced for the Timurid court, such as a copy of Sa‛di’s Gulistan (1486; Art and History Collection, LTS1995.2.30), copy of ‛Attar’s Mantiq al-tayr (1487; Met., 63.210) and a copy of Sa‛di’s Bustan (1488; Egyptian N. Lib., Adab Farsi 908). After death of Sultan Husayn in 1506 and overthrow of the Timurid dynasty Sultan ‛Ali retired to Mashhad. There in 1514 he wrote Adab-i Khatt (“Etiquette of Calligraphy”), a verse treatise in Persian on writing and teaching calligraphy, which was later incorporated in Qazi Ahmad’s biography of calligraphers and painters. This work contains both practical and autobiographical information and shows the close association between religious discipline and the practice of calligraphy. He died in Mashhad.

Compared to the hand of his predecessor Jafar Tabrizi (fl 1412-1431), Sultan ‛Ali's is more spacious, delicate and fluid. He shows a mastery of control and modulation, introducing visual rhythms by elongating and emphasizing certain forms, like the stroke on letter kaph. Nastaliq of Sultan ‛Ali "demonstrates a fine balance between fluidity and discipline, the same characteristics that he mentioned in his treatise on calligraphy". In his writings the eastern, or Khurasani, style of nastaliq, associated with Jafar and Azhar, reached its classic form, and in Safavid period also became the predominant in western Iran. "The eastern style, as further perfected in the following centuries, is the nastaliq now in use in Persia". Because of this nastaliq of Sultan ‛Ali "remained the epitome of the style, assidously collected and treasured by later connoiseurs and emulated by his successors for centuries to come". Qazi Ahmad wrote about Sultan ‛Ali that "His writing conquered the world and is among other writings as the sun among other planets". Sultan ‛Ali trained many great calligraphers of the 16th century, like Sultan Muhammad Nur or Sultan Muhammad Khandan.

References

Bibliography 
 
 
 

Iranian calligraphers
People from Mashhad
1520 deaths
Poets from the Timurid Empire
16th-century writers of Safavid Iran
16th-century Iranian people
15th-century Iranian people
Burials at Imam Reza Shrine
Calligraphers of the medieval Islamic world